Heart of Lions Football Club is a Ghanaian professional football club based in Kpandu, Volta. The club competed in the Glo Premier League, being relegated in 2015.

The club is a 2 time Winner of GHALCA top 4 Competition in 2005 and 2009 respectively. 

There are also the last club to win the Sports Writers Association Of Ghana (SWAG) Cup in 2009.

History
Heart of Lions FC wereand also finished in the top four of the competition the same year.

Former squad

Former coaches 

  Mehmet Tayfun Türkmen
Paa Kwesi Fabin

Performance in CAF competitions
 CAF Confederation Cup: 1 appearance
2005 – withdrew in First Round
 CAF Champions League: 1 appearance
2009

References

External links
 Heart Of Lions FC – Official Site

Football clubs in Ghana
2002 establishments in Ghana
Association football clubs established in 2002
Sports clubs in Ghana
Volta Region
Heart of Lions F.C.